Mehdy Guezoui (born 30 March 1989) is a French former professional footballer who played as a forward.

Career 
After spending all of his early career in the lower divisions of the French league, Guezoui made his professional debut for Valenciennes FC in a 1–1 Ligue 2 tie with Gazélec Ajaccio on 28 July 2017, wherein he managed to score on his debut.

In January 2019, he signed a 3.5-year contract with FC Chambly.

On 2 August 2021, he moved to Villefranche. His contract with Villefranche was terminated on 17 January 2023.

Personal life
Guezoui was born in France to a Moroccan father and an Algerian mother.

References

External links
 
 
 
 Valenciennes Profile

1989 births
Living people
People from Lens, Pas-de-Calais
Sportspeople from Pas-de-Calais
Footballers from Hauts-de-France
Association football forwards
French footballers
French sportspeople of Moroccan descent
French sportspeople of Algerian descent
Chamois Niortais F.C. players
AS Beauvais Oise players
CS Sedan Ardennes players
US Quevilly-Rouen Métropole players
Valenciennes FC players
FC Chambly Oise players
Les Herbiers VF players
FC Villefranche Beaujolais players
Ligue 2 players
Championnat National 2 players
Championnat National players